Golden Arm may refer to:

 Golden Arm, a term used in craps 
 The Golden Arm, a folk tale
 Golden Arm (film), 2020 American comedy film 
 Golden Arm Trio, American jazz group
 The Johnny Unitas Golden Arm Award in American college football
 Kid with the Golden Arm, 1979 Hong Kong martial arts film
 The Man with the Golden Arm, American film
 The Man with the Golden Arm (novel)
 James Harrison (blood donor), also known as the Man with the Golden Arm